Encephalartos sclavoi, common name Sclavo's cycad, is a critically endangered cycad in the family Zamiaceae. It is endemic to Tanzania, with a population of only ~50 mature plants.

Description

It was described in 1990 by Aldo Moretti, D.W. Stevenson and Paolo Deluca, honoring Jean Pierre Sclavo, a French collector of cycads, who first discovered this species.

References

External links
 
 

sclavoi
Endemic flora of Tanzania
Endangered plants